Paul Cazan (born 30 September 1951, in Bucharest) is a Romanian former football player and former coach who mostly played and coached for Sportul Studenţesc of Bucharest. He won the Universiade gold medal with Romania's students football team in the 1974 edition that was held in France, playing alongside László Bölöni, Gheorghe Mulțescu, Dan Păltinișanu and Romulus Chihaia. His son, Lucian Cazan, is also a footballer, currently playing for FC Voluntari.

Honours

Player

Club
Sportul Studenţesc
Balkans Cup (1): 1979–80
Liga I Runner-up (1): 1985–86
Cupa României Runner-up (1): 1978–79

References

External links
 

1951 births
Living people
Association football defenders
Footballers from Bucharest
Romanian footballers
FC Sportul Studențesc București players
FC Steaua București players
FC Sportul Studențesc București managers
Romanian football managers